Jason Michael Berman is an American film producer and executive. He serves as the President of Mandalay Pictures, where he is responsible for developing and structuring financing for Mandalay's slate of independent films, in addition to packaging projects. He was named by Variety in 2011 as one of the Top Ten Producers to Watch. and by Deadline Hollywood in 2012 as one of the Top Ten Producers to Watch at Sundance.

Early life
Berman is originally from Baltimore, Maryland. Prior to producing, Berman started his career at the William Morris Agency in Beverly Hills, California. His later worked under the Chief Operating Officer at MGM Studios, and then for writer/director Gary Ross. Berman is a 2006 graduate of the University of Southern California, School of Cinematic Arts, where he became an adjunct professor teaching a course on Entrepreneurship in Entertainment. He is a co-founder of the Sundance Institute Catalyst Initiative. Berman is a member of the Producers Guild of America, and lives in Los Angeles, California.

Career
Berman produced Nate Parker's The Birth of a Nation (2016) about the true story of Nat Turner's slave rebellion. The film premiered in the U.S. Dramatic Competition at the 2016 Sundance Film Festival. Jason is also in post-production on Mark Elijah Rosenberg's AD Inexplorata starring Mark Strong. Berman also produced Jonas Carpignano's Mediterannea, Andrew Renzi's Franny, and Sara Colangelo's Little Accidents.

Berman's other producing credits include The Dry Land, Seven Days in Utopia, The Brooklyn Brothers Beat the Best, LUV, Struck by Lightning, Kilimanjaro, and X/Y. In 2022 it was announced he was producing a film about the 1956 Sugar Bowl and Atlanta Riots along with Anthony Mackie.

Films produced

Film

References

External links
 

USC School of Cinematic Arts alumni
Living people
American film producers
Year of birth missing (living people)
People from Baltimore